Thomas Gibson (8 January 1825 – 1901) was an Ontario political figure. He represented Huron North in the Legislative Assembly of Ontario from 1871 to 1874 and Huron East from 1875 to 1898. He was a Liberal.

Life

He was born in Greenlaw, Berwickshire, Scotland in Jan 1825, the son of Thomas Gibson (1751–1820) and his wife Helen Lunham. He was educated at the free church school in Greenlaw. He came to Canada West in 1854. He served as reeve for Howick Township for 7 years. He ran unsuccessfully in Huron North in 1867.

The township of Gibson, now part of the Township of Georgian Bay in the Muskoka District, was named after him.

He died in January 1901 and is buried in Wroxeter, Ontario with his wife Elizabeth (1830–1878).

His nephew was the noted mathematician Prof George Alexander Gibson FRSE (1858–1930).

References

External links 
Member's parliamentary history for the Legislative Assembly of Ontario
The Canadian parliamentary companion and annual register, 1891, J Durie

1825 births
1901 deaths
Ontario Liberal Party MPPs
People from Berwickshire
People from Huron County, Ontario
Scottish emigrants to pre-Confederation Ontario
Immigrants to the Province of Canada